Asansol Ramakrishna Mission High School is an Bengali-medium school for boys in Asansol, West Bengal, India. It was established in 1939 and is part of the Ramakrishna Mission Ashrama, Asansol; a branch of Ramakrishna Mission. It is affiliated to the West Bengal Board of Secondary Education.

History 
In 1926, few devotees, inspired by Swami Vivekananda's ideology established a Ramakrishna mission in Asansol, presently at Paschim Bardhaman district, in the Indian state of West Bengal. Belur Math took it over as one of its branches in 1939 and it was renamed as Ramakrishna Mission Ashrama, Asansol. Initially the Mission's activities were on a small scale with only an orphanage and a school for girls. Later a boys' school was started which was upgraded to a High School in 1944.

References

External links 
 

Schools affiliated with the Ramakrishna Mission
High schools and secondary schools in West Bengal
Boarding schools in West Bengal
Boys' schools in India
Educational institutions established in 1939
1939 establishments in India